Fenakiwi or Festa Nacional do Kiwi (that is Portuguese for National Kiwi Fest) is a city celebration in the city of Farroupilha, Rio Grande do Sul, Brazil.  Farroupilha is located in the Serra Gaúcha.

External links
Kiwi Fest Fenakiwi

Food and drink festivals in Brazil
Fruit festivals
Kiwifruit